Ilog means river in Filipino, and is the name of two places in the Philippines:

 Ilog, Negros Occidental
 Ilog, a barangay in Taal, Batangas
 ILOG, a software company that makes products including JRules.
 iLog is a hand held wooden log like electronic instrument made by the Owl Project, and artist collaboration from the UK.